The Holy Spirit Rock or Holy Ghost Rock, also known as the Agion Pneuma in Greek, is a rock in the Meteora rock formation complex of Thessaly, Greece.

Monasteries and sites
The Monks' Prison (Filakaé Monakón) is built in long vertical crevice on the eastern side of the Holy Spirit Rock. From Kastraki, it can be reached via an unmarked hiking trail.

The Monastery of the Holy Spirit is built on a 300-metre high cliff. A path carved into the cliff leads to the church, which has survived to this day. The frescoes have completely decayed. The altar, sacristy, and prayer book are carved into the rock, and at the entrance to the right is a carved coffin where the clergyman's grave is located. To the left of the shrine are two cisterns for collecting rainwater. There are abandoned cells and trees in several places. At the top of the cliff is an iron cross, said to have been erected by the Serbian king Stefan Dušan.

The  is also located on the rock. Kerchiefs (mandilia) are traditionally hung at the cave entrance. It may have been one of the four monasteries founded around 1367 by Neilos, the Prior of the Skete of Stagoi. The Cave of St. George of Mandila may be the same as the Cave of Archimandrite Makarios near Pigadion. The base can be easily reached from Kastraki, but rock climbing is needed to reach the actual cave.

Stylos Stagon (Στύλος Σταγών), a rock pillar, is part of the Holy Spirit rock complex.

The Monastery of Theostiriktos (Μονή Θεοστηρίκτου) is located in the Holy Spirit Rock area, but its exact location is uncertain.

Access
A network of trails surrounding the rock can be reached from the village of Kastraki.

References

Rocks of Meteora
Holy Spirit
Cliff dwellings
Former Christian monasteries in Greece